The 3rd constituency of the Aveyron is a French legislative constituency in the Aveyron département.

Deputies

Election results

2022

 
 
 
 
 
 
 
 
|-
| colspan="8" bgcolor="#E9E9E9"|
|-

2017

2012

|- style="background-color:#E9E9E9;text-align:center;"
! colspan="2" rowspan="2" style="text-align:left;" | Candidate
! rowspan="2" colspan="2" style="text-align:left;" | Party
! colspan="2" | 1st round
! colspan="2" | 2nd round
|- style="background-color:#E9E9E9;text-align:center;"
! width="75" | Votes
! width="30" | %
! width="75" | Votes
! width="30" | %
|-
| style="background-color:" |
| style="text-align:left;" | Alain Marc
| style="text-align:left;" | Union for a Popular Movement
| UMP
| 
| 38.16%
| 
| 53.96%
|-
| style="background-color:" |
| style="text-align:left;" | Marie-Thérèse Foulquier
| style="text-align:left;" | The Greens
| VEC
| 
| 21.79%
| 
| 46.04%
|-
| style="background-color:" |
| style="text-align:left;" | Béatrice Marre
| style="text-align:left;" | Miscellaneous Left
| DVG
| 
| 15.50%
| colspan="2" style="text-align:left;" |
|-
| style="background-color:" |
| style="text-align:left;" | Marie-Claude Fayard
| style="text-align:left;" | National Front
| FN
| 
| 8.48%
| colspan="2" style="text-align:left;" |
|-
| style="background-color:" |
| style="text-align:left;" | Jean-Luc Pouget
| style="text-align:left;" | Left Front
| FG
| 
| 5.78%
| colspan="2" style="text-align:left;" |
|-
| style="background-color:" |
| style="text-align:left;" | Philippe Ramondenc
| style="text-align:left;" | Miscellaneous Right
| DVD
| 
| 4.86%
| colspan="2" style="text-align:left;" |
|-
| style="background-color:" |
| style="text-align:left;" | Norbert Castelltort
| style="text-align:left;" | Miscellaneous Right
| DVD
| 
| 2.83%
| colspan="2" style="text-align:left;" |
|-
| style="background-color:" |
| style="text-align:left;" | Philippe Dargagnon
| style="text-align:left;" | Ecologist
| ECO
| 
| 1.04%
| colspan="2" style="text-align:left;" |
|-
| style="background-color:" |
| style="text-align:left;" | Nicolas Bestard
| style="text-align:left;" | Far Left
| EXG
| 
| 0.79%
| colspan="2" style="text-align:left;" |
|-
| style="background-color:" |
| style="text-align:left;" | Stéphane Cabrol
| style="text-align:left;" | Regionalist
| REG
| 
| 0.41%
| colspan="2" style="text-align:left;" |
|-
| style="background-color:" |
| style="text-align:left;" | Bernard Combes
| style="text-align:left;" | Far Left
| EXG
| 
| 0.37%
| colspan="2" style="text-align:left;" |
|-
| colspan="8" style="background-color:#E9E9E9;"|
|- style="font-weight:bold"
| colspan="4" style="text-align:left;" | Total
| 
| 100%
| 
| 100%
|-
| colspan="8" style="background-color:#E9E9E9;"|
|-
| colspan="4" style="text-align:left;" | Registered voters
| 
| style="background-color:#E9E9E9;"|
| 
| style="background-color:#E9E9E9;"|
|-
| colspan="4" style="text-align:left;" | Blank/Void ballots
| 
| 2.35%
| 
| 3.81%
|-
| colspan="4" style="text-align:left;" | Turnout
| 
| 66.26%
| 
| 66.89%
|-
| colspan="4" style="text-align:left;" | Abstentions
| 
| 33.74%
| 
| 33.11%
|-
| colspan="8" style="background-color:#E9E9E9;"|
|- style="font-weight:bold"
| colspan="6" style="text-align:left;" | Result
| colspan="2" style="background-color:" | UMP HOLD
|}

2007

|- style="background-color:#E9E9E9;text-align:center;"
! colspan="2" rowspan="2" style="text-align:left;" | Candidate
! rowspan="2" colspan="2" style="text-align:left;" | Party
! colspan="2" | 1st round
! colspan="2" | 2nd round
|- style="background-color:#E9E9E9;text-align:center;"
! width="75" | Votes
! width="30" | %
! width="75" | Votes
! width="30" | %
|-
| style="background-color:" |
| style="text-align:left;" | Alain Marc
| style="text-align:left;" | Union for a Popular Movement
| UMP
| 
| 49.50%
| 
| 57.67%
|-
| style="background-color:" |
| style="text-align:left;" | Béatrice Marre
| style="text-align:left;" | Socialist Party
| PS
| 
| 27.01%
| 
| 42.33%
|-
| style="background-color:" |
| style="text-align:left;" | Hugues Robert
| style="text-align:left;" | Democratic Movement
| MoDem
| 
| 6.28%
| colspan="2" style="text-align:left;" |
|-
| style="background-color:" |
| style="text-align:left;" | Inaki Aranceta
| style="text-align:left;" | Far Left
| EXG
| 
| 3.35%
| colspan="2" style="text-align:left;" |
|-
| style="background-color:" |
| style="text-align:left;" | Martine Perez
| style="text-align:left;" | Communist
| COM
| 
| 3.01%
| colspan="2" style="text-align:left;" |
|-
| style="background-color:" |
| style="text-align:left;" | Yves Frémion
| style="text-align:left;" | The Greens
| VEC
| 
| 2.98%
| colspan="2" style="text-align:left;" |
|-
| style="background-color:" |
| style="text-align:left;" | Michel Dorlin
| style="text-align:left;" | National Front
| FN
| 
| 2.74%
| colspan="2" style="text-align:left;" |
|-
| style="background-color:" |
| style="text-align:left;" | Simone Evesque-Heran
| style="text-align:left;" | Hunting, Fishing, Nature, Traditions
| CPNT
| 
| 2.41%
| colspan="2" style="text-align:left;" |
|-
| style="background-color:" |
| style="text-align:left;" | Marie-Joëlle Aubril
| style="text-align:left;" | Ecologist
| ECO
| 
| 1.08%
| colspan="2" style="text-align:left;" |
|-
| style="background-color:" |
| style="text-align:left;" | Isabelle Marit-Antonin
| style="text-align:left;" | Divers
| DIV
| 
| 0.99%
| colspan="2" style="text-align:left;" |
|-
| style="background-color:" |
| style="text-align:left;" | Bernard Combes
| style="text-align:left;" | Far Left
| EXG
| 
| 0.66%
| colspan="2" style="text-align:left;" |
|-
| colspan="8" style="background-color:#E9E9E9;"|
|- style="font-weight:bold"
| colspan="4" style="text-align:left;" | Total
| 
| 100%
| 
| 100%
|-
| colspan="8" style="background-color:#E9E9E9;"|
|-
| colspan="4" style="text-align:left;" | Registered voters
| 
| style="background-color:#E9E9E9;"|
| 
| style="background-color:#E9E9E9;"|
|-
| colspan="4" style="text-align:left;" | Blank/Void ballots
| 
| 2.71%
| 
| 4.00%
|-
| colspan="4" style="text-align:left;" | Turnout
| 
| 68.77%
| 
| 68.50%
|-
| colspan="4" style="text-align:left;" | Abstentions
| 
| 31.23%
| 
| 31.50%
|-
| colspan="8" style="background-color:#E9E9E9;"|
|- style="font-weight:bold"
| colspan="6" style="text-align:left;" | Result
| colspan="2" style="background-color:" | UMP HOLD
|}

2002

 
 
 
 
 
 
 
 
 
|-
| colspan="8" bgcolor="#E9E9E9"|
|-

1997

References

Sources
 Official results of French elections from 1998: 

3